The Giove Fulminante class were the first class of third-rate ships of the line built by the Venetian Arsenal, from 1666 to 1691, armed with 62 to 68 guns. The fifth ship of the class was extensively modified during construction and became the lead ship of the following . The last ship of the class was retired in 1709.

Ships

Notes

References

Bibliography 

 
 

 
Ship of the line classes
Ships built by the Venetian Arsenal
17th century in the Republic of Venice
18th century in the Republic of Venice